The 2020–21 season was the 143rd year in existence of West Bromwich Albion and their first season back in the Premier League after a two-year absence, following promotion from the Championship in the previous season. They also participated in the FA Cup and the EFL Cup.

On 16 December 2020, Albion parted company with head coach Slaven Bilić, after winning one of the first 13 league games. Sam Allardyce was confirmed as his successor later that day, with the former England manager taking charge of his eighth Premier League club, a competition record. 

West Brom were relegated back to the Championship, after just one season in the Premier League, following an away defeat to Arsenal on 9 May 2021. This equalled Norwich City's record of five Premier League relegations and was the first time that a team managed by Sam Allardyce had been relegated from the top flight.

Background
Prior to the start of the season, sports journalists were pessimistic about West Bromwich Albion's chances of surviving relegation. Phil McNulty, the BBC's chief football writer, thought that Albion would finish in 19th place, while Henry Winter of The Times also forecast relegation. The Guardian predicted a 20th-place finish, while identifying Matheus Pereira as Albion's key player.

Restrictions stemming from the COVID-19 pandemic in the United Kingdom created uncertainty surrounding the reintroduction of supporters to football stadia. As a result, the club did not issue full season tickets in 2020–21.

Albion unveiled three new kits for the season, designed in tribute to the "barcode" design worn by the club's promotion winning team of 1992–93. The home kit featured navy blue and white striped shirts, white shorts and navy blue socks, while the away colours comprised green and yellow striped shirts, green shorts and yellow socks. The third kit was made up of red and yellow stripes, red shorts and yellow socks. The kits were manufactured by Puma and were sponsored by Ideal Boilers. Alongside all other Premier League clubs, West Bromwich Albion's players wore a "No Room For Racism" badge on their shirts; this replaced the "Black Lives Matter" badges worn at the end of the previous Premier League season.

First-team squad

Transfers

Transfers in

Loans in

Loans out

Transfers out

Friendly matches

Competitions

Premier League

Following their promotion from the 2019–20 EFL Championship, West Bromwich Albion are competing in the 2020–21 Premier League, the 29th season of English football's top division since its breakaway from the Football League in 1992. It is Albion's 13th season in the Premier League, 81st season in the top division of English football and their 122nd season of league football in all.

Albion defeated Chelsea 5–2 in April in what was their first victory at Stamford Bridge since 1978.

League table

Results summary

Results by matchday

Matches
The 2020–21 season fixtures were released on 20 August.

FA Cup

The third round draw was made on 30 November, with Premier League and EFL Championship clubs all entering the competition.

EFL Cup

The draw for both the second and third round were confirmed on 6 September, live on Sky Sports by Phil Babb.

Statistics

|-
!colspan=14|Players who left the club:

|}

Goals record

Disciplinary record

References

West Bromwich Albion F.C. seasons
West Bromwich Albion